The 92nd Assembly District of Wisconsin is one of 99 districts in the Wisconsin State Assembly.  Located in western Wisconsin, the district covers all of Buffalo and Trempealeau counties, as well as most Pepin County, the western half of Jackson County, and part of southern Eau Claire County.  It includes the cities of Arcadia, Galesville, Independence, Mondovi, and Whitehall, and contains Trempealeau National Wildlife Refuge and Perrot State Park.  The district is represented by Republican Treig Pronschinske, since January 2017.

The 92nd Assembly district is located within Wisconsin's 31st Senate district, along with the 91st and 93rd Assembly districts.

List of past representatives

References 

Wisconsin State Assembly districts
Buffalo County, Wisconsin
Jackson County, Wisconsin
Trempealeau County, Wisconsin